Günter Schliwka (born 9 May 1956) is a German weightlifter. He competed in the men's middleweight event at the 1980 Summer Olympics.

References

External links
 

1956 births
Living people
German male weightlifters
Olympic weightlifters of East Germany
Weightlifters at the 1980 Summer Olympics
People from Wolmirstedt
World Weightlifting Championships medalists
Sportspeople from Saxony-Anhalt
20th-century German people
21st-century German people